Stefanie Pesendorfer (born 31 August 2003) is an Austrian figure skater. She is the 2019 Tirnavia Ice Cup champion, the 2019 Prague Ice Cup champion, and the 2022 Austrian champion. She finished 12th at the 2018 World Junior Championships.

Personal life 
Pesendorfer was born on 31 August 2003 in Wels, Austria. As of February 2019, she is a high school student at Handelsschule für Leistungssport in Linz.

Career

Early years
Pesendorfer began learning to skate in 2007, at age four. After impressing in a kindergarten course, she joined Union Eissportklub in Linz. She competed in the advanced novice ranks from October 2015 through April 2017.

2017–2018 season
Coached by Denise Jaschek and Markus Haider in Linz, Pesendorfer made her international junior debut at the ISU Junior Grand Prix in Austria in August 2017. She finished 16th at JGP Austria and 12th at her second JGP assignment, in Zagreb, Croatia.

In December, she won the junior ladies title at the 2018 Austrian Championships and was assigned to the 2018 World Junior Championships in Sofia, Bulgaria. Competing in March at Junior Worlds, Pesendorfer qualified for the free skate after placing 13th in the short program. She finished 12th overall.

2018–2019 season
Pesendorfer sat out the 2018–19 ISU Junior Grand Prix series, competing only at the 2018 Golden Bear of Zagreb and 2018 Skate Celje in the fall. At Skate Celje, she won the junior bronze medal.

At the 2019 Austrian Championships, Pesendorfer won the junior silver medal behind Olga Mikutina. She was assigned to the 2019 European Youth Olympic Winter Festival, where she placed seventh.

2019–2020 season
Competing on the Junior Grand Prix, Pesendorfer placed eleventh at JGP France and seventeenth at JGP Russia.  Making her debut in international senior competition, she competed at three events on the Challenger series, placing ninth at Nebelhorn Trophy, eleventh at the Nepela Memorial, and fifteenth at the Golden Spin of Zagreb.

Placing second at junior nationals for the second consecutive season and then winning bronze in her senior national debut, Pesendorfer finished the season with a fifteenth-placed finish at the 2020 World Junior Championships.

2020–2021 season
Debuting at the 2020 CS Nebelhorn Trophy, an event attended only by European skaters due to pandemic-related travel restrictions, Pesendorfer placed twelfth.

2021–2022 season
Pesendorfer placed sixteenth at the 2021 CS Lombardia Trophy. She went on to win the bronze medal at two minor internationals and finish fifteenth at the 2021 CS Cup of Austria before winning the Austrian national title. She was nevertheless not named to the Austrian Olympic team, but made her World Championship debut, finishing thirty-second.

2022–2023 season
Beginning the season at the 2022 CS Nebelhorn Trophy, Pesendorfer finished in eighth place.

Programs

Competitive highlights 
CS: Challenger Series; JGP: Junior Grand Prix

Detailed results 
Small medals for short and free programs awarded only at ISU Championships. ISU Personal bests are highlighted in bold.

Senior results

Junior results

References

External links
 

Austrian female single skaters
2003 births
Living people
People from Wels
Sportspeople from Upper Austria